Haiphong, or Hải Phòng, is a major industrial city and the third-largest in Vietnam. Hai Phong is also the center of technology, economy, culture, medicine, education, science and trade in the Red River delta. In the past, Hai Phong is the first place with electricity in Vietnam.

Haiphong was founded in 1887 as a major seaport city of Vietnam. In 1888, the president of the French Third Republic, Sadi Carnot, promulgated a decree to establish Haiphong. From 1954 to 1975, Haiphong served as the most important maritime city of North Vietnam, and it became one of direct-controlled municipalities of a reunified Vietnam with Hanoi and Ho Chi Minh City in 1976.

Haiphong has a Human Development Index of 0.782 (high), ranking fourth among all municipalities and provinces of Vietnam.

History

Dynastic Vietnam
Haiphong was the home of Lê Chân, one of the female generals under the command of the Trưng Sisters who rose against Chinese rule in 40 AD and ruled until their defeat in 43 AD. Centuries later under the Mạc dynasty, the area earned the appellation Hải-dương thương-chính quan-phòng ("The trading defensive area of Hải Dương Province") as it protected the eastern flank of Mac kings' home province.

By the 19th century at the end of Nguyễn Emperor Tự Đức's reign, the Hang Kenh Communal House in what is now the city's Le Chan District was made the administrative seat of An Dương District, restoring its regional importance. The area by then had developed into a sizable commercial port.

At the eve of the French conquest in 1881, a typhoon ravaged the area, killing about 3,000 people in and around Haiphong. Despite the damages, Haiphong was developed by the French to serve as Indochina's main naval base over the ensuing decades.

Democratic Republic of Vietnam and the Vietnam War

Following the defeat of Japan in World War II, Vietnamese nationalists agitated for independence against French return. French forces landed in Haiphong and encountered resistance which resulted in the deaths of three French soldiers. In retaliation, the French ships, among them the cruiser Suffren, shelled the city, setting it ablaze and precipitating the First Indochina War. French infantry forces under the command of Jean-Étienne Valluy entered the city, fighting house to house with the support of armored units and airplanes.

Late in the Vietnam War, Haiphong was subjected to heavy bombing by US Navy and Air Force strike aircraft because it was North Vietnam's only major port. U.S. Admiral Thomas H. Moorer ordered the mining of Haiphong harbor on 8 May 1972, effectively sealing the port. Until it was lifted, the mining caused no casualty. Despite being targeted, the physical structure of the city was mostly unaffected by the war as the US had a self-imposed prohibition zone for the city. After the war, the city recovered its role as a significant industrial center.

Geography

The Bính Bridge crosses the Cam and connects the city with Thủy Nguyên District. It borders Quảng Ninh Province to the north, Hải Dương Province to the west, Thái Bình Province to the south, and the Gulf of Tonkin to the east. Bach Long Vi island, Cat Ba Island and the Long Châu islands, located in the Gulf, are also administered as part of the city. Tidal flat ecosystems occur adjacent to the city, however, many have been reclaimed for agriculture or development purposes.

Climate
Haiphong features a humid subtropical climate with hot, humid summers and warm, dry winters. The city is noticeably wetter from April through October; roughly 90% of the city's annual rainfall (which totals approximately ) typically falls during these months. There is a noticeable difference in temperatures between the city's winters and summers.

Administrative divisions

Haiphong is subdivided into 15 district-level sub-divisions:

They are further subdivided into 10 commune-level towns (or townlets), 148 communes, and 72 wards.

Table of local government districts

Economy
Haiphong is a major economic center of the North in particular and Vietnam in general both. Under French domination, Haiphong was level 1 city, equal to Saigon and Hanoi. The last years of the 19th century, the French had proposed to build Haiphong into the economic capital of Indochina.
Today, Haiphong is still one of the most important economic centers of Vietnam. In 2009, Haiphong state budget revenue reached 34,000 billion Vnd. In 2011, budget revenues in the city reached 47,725 billion, increase 19% compared to 2010. In 2015, total revenues of the city reached 56 288 billion. Government plans that to 2020, Haiphong's revenues will be over 80,000 billion and the domestic revenue reach 20.000 billion. In the ranking of the Provincial Competitiveness Index (PCI) 2013 of Vietnam, Haiphong city ranked at No. 15/63 provinces.
Haiphong has relationship of trading goods with more than 40 countries and territories around the world. Haiphong is striving to become one of the largest commercial centers of the country.

Industry
Industry is a key sector in Haiphong including food processing, light industries and heavy industries. Major products include fish sauce, beer, cigarettes, textiles, paper, plastic pipes, cement, iron, pharmaceuticals, electric fans, motorbikes, steel pipes and ships and out-sourcing software implementation. Most of these industries have been growing significantly between 2000 and 2007, with the exceptions of the cigarette and pharmaceutical industries. Shipbuilding, steel pipes, plastic pipes and textiles are among the industries with the most rapid growth.

There are also growing industries supplying products used by existing industries in the city. PetroVietnam set up a joint-venture PVTex with textile manufacturer Vinatex to build Vietnam's first polyester fiber plant in Haiphong. The factory will use by-products from oil-refining and reduce reliance on imported materials. 270,600 people were employed in Haiphong's industry. 112,600 industrial jobs were created between 2000 and 2007.

Agriculture, forestry and fishery 

Despite its status as a city, around one third of Haiphong's area or 52,300 ha (as of 2007) are used for agriculture. Rice is the most important crop, taking up around 80% of the agricultural land with an output of 463,100 tons in 2007. Other agricultural products include maize, sugar and peanuts.

Haiphong has a relatively large fishing sector with an output of 79,705 tons (2007). Gross output has almost doubled between 2000 and 2007, mostly due to fast growth in aquaculture, which made up 60% of gross output in 2007. Despite its coastal location, sea fish contribute relatively little to the sector (around one fourth). Nam Định Province and Thái Bình Province have much larger fishing sectors and even the inland Hải Dương Province has a larger gross output from fishing than Haiphong.

As of 2007, 315,500 were employed in agriculture and fishery, a significant decrease from 396,300 in 2000. However, these sectors still account for almost a third of total employment in Haiphong, a larger share than industry. However, gross output in both agriculture and fishery have been growing significantly between 2000 and 2007.

Demographics

The gender distribution is half female (50.4%).

Population growth 
As of the 2009 census, Haiphong's average annual population growth rate was given as 4.0%. Haiphong's crude birth rate was recorded at 18.1 live births per 1000 persons vs the crude death rate of 7.6 per 1000 persons. Life expectancy at birth was estimated at 77.1 years for women and 72.0 years for men, or 74.5 years overall. Infant mortality rate was measured at 11.8 infant deaths per 1000 live births, just over two points above the nation's average for urban areas. In the same census, the city's out-migration was 1.9% vs in-migration of 2.8% and, for a net migration rate of 0.9%.

Education
 Haiphong Maritime High School
 Hai Phong Medical University
 Hai Phong University
 
 Vietnam Maritime University

Transport

Roads 

Haiphong is located at the junction of two National Highways: Route 5, leading west to Hanoi, and Route 10, leading south to Nam Định and onward to connect with National Route 1 at Ninh Bình. Highway 356 passes west–east from the Route 5/10 junction through Haiphong's city center all the way to the coast. A connecting road from route 5 to route 18 links Haiphong with Quảng Ninh Province. In 2015, the new highway connecting Haiphong with Hanoi was completed; this is the most modern highway in Vietnam and reduces the trip by one hour as compared to the previous route.

Within the city there are several long-distance bus depots:  Niem Nghia, Vinh Niem, Thuong Ly.

A new highway route was completed last year 2016 to make the transfer faster and easier. From Hanoi to Haiphong and back, it takes less than 2 hours to reach not so long as 3 hours as before. Also shorten the distance from Haiphong to Thai Binh, Hai Duong, Hung Yen.

Tourists can easily catch a coach from Niem Nghia bus station to Hanoi or Cat Ba island, either Quang Ninh, or South of Vietnam.

Airports 

The main airport serving Haiphong is Cat Bi International Airport with three flights daily to Ho Chi Minh city. In April 2011, Vietnam Airlines launched routes to Da Nang with 5 flights a week. An international airport for Haiphong, situated in Tien Lang district, is in the planning stages; if realized it would become the largest airport in northern Vietnam.

Seaports

Haiphong port is one of the largest ports in Vietnam and south-east Asia as a whole. The Port of Haiphong on the Cấm River is divided into three main docks: Hoang Dieu (Central terminal) located near the city's center, Chua Ve, and Dinh Vu both farther downstream to the east. Several ferry terminals connect Haiphong with the neighboring Cát Hải and Cát Bà Islands; Ben Binh Ferry terminal is located near the city center while Dinh Vu Ferry is located on a spit of land on the coast. The government had approved the plans to build an international port in Lach Huyen – 15 kilometers from the current port. Once completed this will be one of the deepest port in Vietnam with draft of 14m, capable of receiving ships up to 100.000 DWT.

Railway

Hai Phong Railway Station built in 1902 is the eastern terminus of the Kunming–Hai Phong Railway, also known as the Yunnan–Vietnam Railway. Built at by the French during their occupation, the railway once connected Haiphong to the city of Kunming in Yunnan, China, although service along the Chinese portion of the line is currently suspended. Rail travel from Haiphong with connections to the rest of the Vietnamese railway network is via Hanoi.

There are daily trains start from 6AM until 6PM from Hai Phong city to the capital Hanoi and return. The trains take approximately 3 hours to arrive to Hanoi as well as the same period back to the landport city.

Cuisine

Hai Phong cuisine is well known for seafood dishes. Seafood restaurants in the Do Son area have very fresh and affordable shrimp, crab, fish, and squid. The style of seafood processing in Hai Phong follows a simple style, emphasizing the essence and freshness of ingredients more than the fussiness in seasoning.

Dishes such as bánh đa cua (red noodle soup with crab), bún cá (fish rice noodle soup), bánh mỳ que cay (spicy stick-bread), cơm cháy hải sản (crispy rice cracker with seafood), nem cua bể (square crab spring rolls),... are now so familiar and famous. These dishes can be found on the streets of other places like Ho Chi Minh City, Hanoi,... but enjoying them on the Red Phoenix Flower City (the other name of Haiphong City) is still the most ideal because of the choice of raw ingredients and cooking secrets of local chefs. Hai Phong cuisine has been promoted to Europe at the Brest Maritime Festival 2008 (France) and resonated greatly.

In addition, Hai Phong also has many other dishes such as mantis shrimp hot pot, bean sprouts salad, sủi dìn, bánh bèo (Haiphong's version, which is different from Hue's version),...

Notable people
 Mạc Đăng Dung (1483–1541) king of Đại Việt country, the founder of the Mạc dynasty
 Nguyễn Bỉnh Khiêm (1491–1585) thinker, poet, prophet, Cao Dai religion saint
 Mai Trung Thu (1906–80) painter
 Văn Cao (1923–95) musician, poet, painter and composer of the national anthem of Vietnam Tiến Quân Ca
 Ngọc Sơn (1970– ) singer, songwriter
 Trà Giang (1942– ) film actress (born in Quảng Ngãi Province, grew up and schooled in Haiphong)
 Wong Kwok-hing (1949– ) Hong Kong trade unionist and a former member of the Legislative Council of Hong Kong (2004-2016)
 Phan Thị Hà Thanh (1991– ) artistic gymnast, first gymnast to win a world medal for Vietnam gymnastics (2011)
 Thu Phương (1972-) famous pop singer and Haiphong native; she now lives in the U.S.

Twin towns – sister cities

 Da Nang, Vietnam
 Incheon, South Korea
 Kitakyushu, Japan
 Livorno, Italy
 Nanning, China
 Saint Petersburg, Russia
 Seattle, United States
 Tianjin, China

Gallery

See also
 List of East Asian ports
 Haiphong Road

References

Notes

External links

 Official Website of Haiphong City 
 Official Website of Haiphong Tourism.
 History of Haiphong: interactive Google Map with specific sites and historic views of the city from French colonial times.

 
Populated places in Haiphong
Hong River Delta
Gulf of Tonkin
Port cities in Vietnam
Cities in Vietnam